Glenn Franklin Howerton III (born April 13, 1976) is an American actor, screenwriter, producer and podcaster. He is best known for playing Dennis Reynolds on the long-running dark satirical comedy It's Always Sunny in Philadelphia (2005–present) on FX/FXX, a series he co-created with Charlie Day and Rob McElhenney, and on which he serves as an executive producer and writer. Since November 2021, he has co-hosted The Always Sunny Podcast, with his fellow co-creators McElhenney and Day.

His other notable performances include those as Jack Griffin, the lead role on NBC's A.P. Bio (2018–2021), Cliff Gilbert on Fox's The Mindy Project (2012–2017), Don Chumph on the first season of FX's Fargo (2014) and Corey Howard, the lead role on the short-lived spin-off comedy That '80s Show (2002). He also voices Fred Jones in the HBO Max series Velma (2023–present).

Early life and education
Glenn Franklin Howerton III was born on April 13, 1976 in Japan, the son of American parents Janice and Glenn Franklin Howerton Jr. His father was a fighter pilot. Almost immediately after his birth, his family moved to Arizona and then New Mexico for a short while. When he was three years old, they moved to the English town of Felixstowe, Suffolk. They subsequently moved to Virginia, followed by South Korea, where they settled in Seoul. When he was 10 years old, the family moved to Montgomery, Alabama.

After graduating from Jefferson Davis High School, he moved to Miami where he spent two years at New World School of the Arts of Miami Dade College. In 1996, he entered Juilliard School's Drama Division in New York City where he graduated with a Bachelor of Fine Arts as part of Group 29 (1996–2000).

Career
In 2002, Howerton starred as Corey Howard in That '80s Show. He went on to guest star on ER as Dr. Nick Cooper in 2003. He had small roles in the films Must Love Dogs (2005), Serenity (2005), Two Weeks (2006), and The Strangers (2008). He also appeared as a doctor in Crank (2006), and reprised the role in its 2009 sequel, Crank: High Voltage.

Howerton is most well-known for playing the deeply narcissistic and anti-social bartender of Paddy's Pub, Dennis Reynolds, one of the main characters on the FX sitcom It’s Always Sunny in Philadelphia (2005–present). The series was co-created by Rob McElhenney, Charlie Day and him, and the three serve as executive producers, writers and main cast members alongside Kaitlin Olson and Danny DeVito. As of season 14, he has also directed two episodes. In December 2021, Always Sunny became the longest-running live-action American comedy of all time with the release of its fifteenth season.

In 2008, Howerton co-created sci-fi comedy Boldly Going Nowhere with Day, McElhenney and writing assistant Adam Stein, but the pilot was permanently shelved. He has also had producing roles on various projects created by other Always Sunny colleagues like David Hornsby such as How to Be a Gentleman, Unsupervised and The Cool Kids. Howerton also did several voice roles including a recurring part on The Cleveland Show as Ernie Krinklesac.

He played the lead role in a film for the first time in 2013, when he landed the character of Will in the CollegeHumor comedy film Coffee Town with co-stars Steve Little and Ben Schwartz. Soon after, he landed recurring roles on the Fox comedy series The Mindy Project (2012–2017) as Cliff Gilbert, the divorce lawyer introduced in season 2 as one of Mindy's love interests, on the critically-acclaimed first season of the FX dark comedy series Fargo (2014–present) as Don Chumph, and on the Showtime comedy-drama series House of Lies (2012–2016) starring Don Cheadle in its final season as the young mayoral candidate Seth Buckley. Howerton also played a small part as the gun-running Dominic in the Netflix Original film Officer Downe (2016) starring Kim Coates.

His next major television role came in 2018 on the NBC single-camera comedy created by Mike O'Brien, A.P. Bio (2018–2021), where he played Jack Griffin, an arrogant Harvard philosophy professor whose fall from grace had forced him to get a job teaching biology to high school students in his hometown of Toledo while plotting to exact revenge on his nemesis and restore his career. The show ran for two seasons on NBC before it was cancelled and then picked up by Peacock, NBC's streaming service, where it ran for another two seasons. In December 2021, it was cancelled for good. In October 2022, it was announced that he would be voicing Fred Jones on the upcoming HBO Max animated series Velma.

Starting in November 2021, Day, McElhenney and Howerton launched The Always Sunny Podcast, a weekly show loosely based on the rewatch format of podcasting, which had grown in popularity in recent years, to coincide with the release of the record-breaking season 15 of It's Always Sunny in Philadelphia. In June 2022, they released Four Walls Whiskey with all proceeds from the 15-year single-malt Irish whiskey going towards supporting the Pennsylvania hospitality industry which was badly hit by the pandemic.

On August 2022, after production had wrapped, it was announced that Howerton would be co-starring with Jay Baruchel in a Canadian biopic directed by Matt Johnson on the rise and fall of BlackBerry as one of its co-founders. The film BlackBerry premiered in competition at Berlinale 2023 on February 17 to positive reviews from critics with Howerton's performance as Jim Balsillie being especially well-received.

Personal life
On September 8, 2009, Howerton married actress Jill Latiano, who guest-starred on the It's Always Sunny in Philadelphia episode "The D.E.N.N.I.S. System" broadcast two months later. Their first son, Miles Robert, was born in 2011, and their second son, Isley Ray, in August 2014.

Howerton has said that he follows a vegan diet "about 95% of the time."

Filmography

Film

Television

Web

Music videos

Theatre

References

External links
 

21st-century American male actors
American male film actors
American male television actors
American television producers
American television writers
American male television writers
Juilliard School alumni
Living people
Male actors from Montgomery, Alabama
Screenwriters from Alabama
1976 births